The Ninian Pipeline is a  long crude oil pipeline, which runs from the Ninian Central platform in the northern North Sea to the Sullom Voe Terminal in Shetland Islands of Scotland.

Specification 
The Ninian pipeline was laid in July 1976.

The pipeline has a corrosion coating and a 65 mm concrete buoyancy coating. There are 200 kg Sacrificial zinc (Impalloy) anodes at ever 12th joint, with a total mass of 150 tonnes. Buckle arrestors comprising steel sleeves 1-inch thick and 2 m long are located every 36th joint.

The pipeline has a maximum design capacity of 910,000 bbl/day and a maximum operating pressure of 1800 psia (124 barg).

Oil production 
Ninian Central acted as an oil reception and export hub for a number of installations in the northern North Sea. Ninian Central receives, or received, oil from the following installations:

 Ninian Northern (24" oil pipeline)
 Ninian Southern (24" oil pipeline)
 Strathspey (8" and 10" oil pipelines)
 Heather (16" oil pipeline)
 Magnus (24" oil pipeline)
 Alwyn (12" oil pipeline)
 Lyell (12" and 8" oil pipeline)

From the Ninian Central oil processing facilities crude oil flows to the crude oil booster pumps, a metering skid and Main Oil Line (MOL) pumps. After the MOL pumps the fluids were co-mingled with oil from the Strathspey, Ninian Northern, Heather and Magnus platforms.

Oil from the field is exported through the 36" pipeline to Sullom Voe (175 km).

The first oil was received at the Sullom Voe Terminal in December 1978.

Owner and operator 
The pipeline was initially operated by BP on behalf of the partner companies.

As of June 2021 the pipeline was operated by EnQuest on behalf of the owners:

 EnQuest Heather Limited (Operator) 18.0511%
 CNR International (UK) Ltd 63.3271%
 Chevron North Sea Ltd 2.2601%
 Total E&P UK Limited 16.3616%

See also 
Ninian Central Platform

External links
 Ninian Pipeline System (BP website)

References 

Energy infrastructure completed in 1978
North Sea energy
Oil and gas industry in Shetland
Oil pipelines in the United Kingdom
BP buildings and structures
Pipelines under the North Sea
1978 establishments in Scotland